The 2001–02 season was Deportivo de La Coruña's 31st season in La Liga, the top division of Spanish football. They also competed in the Copa del Rey and the UEFA Champions League.

Season summary

Javier Irureta's fourth season in charge of Deportivo was another successful one, as they finished as La Liga runners-up for the second consecutive year, seven points behind champions Valencia. Diego Tristán's 20 league goals saw him become the first Depor player to win the Pichichi Trophy since Bebeto in 1992–93. Deportivo also tasted success in the Copa del Rey, beating Real Madrid in the final to lift the trophy for the second time in their history, and the first since 1994–95.

In the UEFA Champions League, they progressed as group winners from the first group stage. They were undefeated in their six matches, which included a fine 3–2 win over Manchester United at Old Trafford. They received a tough draw in the second group stage, where they faced Arsenal, Bayer Leverkusen and Juventus. Despite two defeats by the German side, they progressed as runners-up, level on points with group winners Leverkusen. They once again faced Manchester United in the quarter-finals, but couldn't repeat the success of the group stages as the English side won 5–2 on aggregate. Depor'''s quarter-final exit matched their performance from the previous year.

Players
Squad

Left club during season

Out on loan for the full season

 (January)

Transfers

In

Out

Squad stats
Appearances and goalsLast updated on 7 April 2021.|-
|colspan="14"|Players who have left the club after the start of the season:|}

Goal scorers

Disciplinary recordUpdated on 7 April 2021''

Competitions

La Liga

League table

Matches

Copa del Rey

1. Deportivo La Coruña successfully appealed against the first leg of their round of 16 tie being played at Estadi Municipal in L'Hospitalet de Llobregat due to its artificial pitch. When told to move the match to Mini Estadi in Barcelona, L'Hospitalet forfeited the tie.

Final

UEFA Champions League

First group stage

Second group stage

Knockout stage

FIFA Club World Championship
As winners of the 1999–2000 La Liga, Deportivo La Coruña was one of the 12 teams that were invited to the 2001 FIFA Club World Championship, which would be hosted in Spain from 28 July to 12 August 2001. However, the tournament was cancelled, primarily due to the collapse of ISL, which was marketing partner of FIFA at the time.

References

Deportivo de La Coruna
Deportivo de La Coruña seasons